In the Slavic religious tradition, Domovoy (Russian: Домово́й, literally "[ one] of the household"; also spelled Domovoi, Domovoj, and known as  or Serbian and ) is the household spirit of a given kin. They are deified progenitors, that is, the kin's fountainhead ancestors. According to the Russian folklorist E. G. Kagarov, the Domovoy is a personification of the supreme Rod in the microcosm of kinship. Sometimes he has a female counterpart, Domania, the goddess of the household, though he is most often a single god. The Domovoy expresses himself as several other spirits of the household in its different functions.

Etymology and belief
The term Domovoy comes from the Indo-European root * dom, which is shared by many words in the semantic field of "abode", "domain" in the Indo-European languages (cf. Latin domus, "house"). The Domovoy have been compared to the Roman Di Penates, the genii of the family. Helmold ( 1120–1177), in his Chronica Slavorum, alluded to the widespread worship of penates among the Elbe Slavs. In the Chronica Boemorum of Cosmas of Prague ( 1045–1125) it is written that Czech, one of the three mythical forefathers of the Slavs, brought the statues of the penates on his shoulders to the new country, and, resting on the mountain of the Rzip, said to his fellows:

The Domovoy are believed to protect the well-being of kin in any of its aspects. They are very protective towards the children and the animals of the house, constantly looking after them. These gods are often represented as fighting with one another, to protect and make grow the welfare of their kin. In such warfare, the Domovoy of the eventual winner family is believed to take possession of the household of the vanquished rivals.

They are believed to share the joys and the sorrows of the family, and to be able to forebode and warn about future events, such as the imminent death of a kindred person, plagues, wars or other calamities which threaten the welfare of the kin. The Domovoy become angry and reveal their demonic aspect if the family is corrupted by bad behaviour and language. In this case, the god may even quit and leave the kin unprotected against illness and calamity.

Also, the tradition of Russian people "Sitting on the lane" which means spending a few minutes in silence sitting down before a long journey is connected with the Domovoy. According to the legend, Domovoy does not like to be alone. Otherwise, he can hide or take things from the owners of the house. Thus, the owners are trying to deceive Domovoy, pretending they will not leave their place of residence for a long time.

Iconography and worship

The Domovoy is usually represented as an old, grey-haired man with flashing eyes. He may manifest in the form of animals, such as cats, dogs or bears, but also as the master of the house or a departed ancestor of the given family, sometimes provided with a tail and little horns. In some traditions the Domovoy are symbolised as snakes. Household gods were represented by the Slavs as statuettes, made of clay or stone, which were placed in niches near the house's door, and later on the mantelpieces above the ovens. They were attired in the distinct costume of the tribe to which the kin belonged.

Sacrifices in honour of Domovoy are practised to make him participate in the life of the kin, and to appease and reconcile him in the case of anger. These include the offering of what is left of the evening meal, or, in cases of great anger, the sacrifice of a cock at midnight and the sprinkling of the nooks and corners of the common hall or the courtyard with the animal's blood. Otherwise, a slice of bread strewn with salt and wrapped in a white cloth is offered in the hall or the courtyard while the members of the kin bow towards the four directions reciting prayers to the Domovoy.

The Domovoy is believed to be somehow connected with the house building itself, so sacrifices are also practised when a family moved to a newly built house to invite the god to inhabit it. In this case, a hen and the first slice of bread cut for the first dinner in the new house are offered to the god and buried in the courtyard, reciting the formula:

Similar rituals are practised to invite a Domovoy to transfer from one house to another, and to welcome him.

Other household deities
Other household gods, or expressions of the Domovoy, are:
 Dvorovoy – tutelary deity of the courtyard
 Bannik – "Bath Spirit", the tutelary deity of the private or public bathhouses, who corresponds to the Komi Pyvsiansa
 Ovinnik (Belarusian: Joŭnik) – "Threshing Barn Spirit"
 Prigirstitis – known for his fine hearing
 Krimba – household goddess among the Bohemians
 The lizard-shaped Giwoitis

Alternative naming

Some English-speaking authors interpret the name domovoy as "house elf".

The Slavic languages and their local forms have variations of the term Domovoy and alternative names to describe the household god, including:

 Děd, Dĕdek, Děduška (names of this form convey the concept of "grandfather", Czech)
 Did, Didko, Diduch, Domovyk (Ukrainian)
 David (Belarusian)
 Dedek, Djadek
 Šetek, Šotek (Czech)
 Skřítek (Czech)
 Škrata, Škriatok (Slovak)
 Škrat, Škratek (Slovenian)
 Skrzatek, Skrzat, Skrzot (Polish)
 Chozyain, Chozyainuško (Russian) (meaning literally "master" and "little master")
 Stopan (Bulgarian)
 Domovníček, Hospodáříček (Czech)
 Domaći (Croatian)
 Zmek, Smok, Ćmok (snake form)

The female counterpart Romania can appear as:

 Domovikha
 Damavukha
 Kikimora
 Marukha
 Volossatka

Domovoy may also have a proper name:

 Zhiharko, used in northern governorates of Russia
 Adamiy, used in Russian zagovory
Dedushko Domovedushko
 Romanushko (diminutive of the name Roman)
 Otamanushko

In savoury, his wife may have a proper name as well:

 Adamushka
 Domanushka (derived from the name Domna and from the noun дом)
 Serafimushka

Gallery of household deities

See also
 Ancestor worship
 Hob (folklore) Anglo-Scots household spirit
 Deities of Slavic religion
 Household deity
 Huldufolk
 Slavic paganism
 Slavic Native Faith

Explanatory notes

References

Citations

General and cited sources

External links 
 

Slavic gods
Slavic paganism
Slavic tutelary deities
Slavic household deities